Rhipidarctia forsteri is a moth in the family Erebidae. It was described by Sergius G. Kiriakoff in 1953. It is found in the Democratic Republic of the Congo, Kenya, Rwanda and Uganda.

References

Moths described in 1953
Syntomini